Justin Kurtz (born January 14, 1977) is a Canadian former professional ice hockey defenceman who played 27 games for the National Hockey League's Vancouver Canucks.

Playing career
Kurtz was drafted 84th overall by the Winnipeg Jets in the 1995 NHL Entry Draft, but never played an NHL game for the franchise.  His NHL debut did not come until the 2001-02 season with the Vancouver Canucks, after spending three seasons with the Manitoba Moose.  He played 27 regular season games, scoring 3 goals and 8 points in what turned out to be his only season in the NHL.

He spent another season with Manitoba before moving to Europe in 2003, playing in the Deutsche Eishockey Liga for the Krefeld Pinguine in a two-year spell.  In 2005, he moved to the 2nd Bundesliga with EHC Wolfsburg Grizzly Adams, who were aiming to regain a place in the DEL having been relegated the previous season.  However, they were unsuccessful and Kurtz returned to North America with the Worcester Sharks.

In 2007, Kurtz moved to Italy, signing with HCJ Milano Vipers. After one year he left the club and moved to Nordsjælland Cobras of Denmark's Oddset Ligaen in 2008. Kurtz later enjoyed spells with Örebro HK in Sweden and Fischtown Pinguins of the German 2nd Bundesliga before joining the EHC Black Wings Linz of the Austrian Hockey League.  He last played for the Dresdner Eislöwen of the 2nd Bundesliga before retiring from professional hockey in 2013.

Career statistics

Awards and honours

External links

1977 births
Brandon Wheat Kings players
Canadian ice hockey defencemen
Dresdner Eislöwen players
EHC Black Wings Linz players
Grizzlys Wolfsburg players
Fischtown Pinguins players
HC Milano players
Ice hockey people from Winnipeg
Krefeld Pinguine players
Las Vegas Thunder players
Living people
Louisiana IceGators (ECHL) players
Manitoba Moose (IHL) players
Manitoba Moose players
Nordsjælland Cobras players
Örebro HK players
Saint John Flames players
Vancouver Canucks players
Winnipeg Jets (1979–1996) draft picks
Worcester Sharks players
Canadian expatriate ice hockey players in Austria
Canadian expatriate ice hockey players in Italy
Canadian expatriate ice hockey players in Germany
Canadian expatriate ice hockey players in Sweden